The Critics' Choice Real TV Awards are accolades for nonfiction, unscripted and reality television content presented by the Critics Choice Association and NPACT. They were established in 2018, and the first ceremony was held on June 2, 2019, and streamed on VH1 on June 9.

Categories

Award ceremonies
 2019
 2020
 2021
 2022

References

 
American television awards
Awards established in 2018